Joseph Falkinburg House is located in Dennis Township, Cape May County, New Jersey, United States. The house was built in 1805 and was added to the National Register of Historic Places on October 3, 1994.

See also
National Register of Historic Places listings in Cape May County, New Jersey

References

Houses completed in 1805
Dennis Township, New Jersey
Houses on the National Register of Historic Places in New Jersey
Georgian architecture in New Jersey
Federal architecture in New Jersey
Italianate architecture in New Jersey
Houses in Cape May County, New Jersey
National Register of Historic Places in Cape May County, New Jersey
1805 establishments in New Jersey
New Jersey Register of Historic Places